Deer Creek is a stream in Benton and Camden counties in the U.S. state of Missouri. It is a tributary of the Osage River.

Deer Creek was named for the abundance of deer along its course.

See also
List of rivers of Missouri

References

Rivers of Benton County, Missouri
Rivers of Camden County, Missouri
Rivers of Missouri